Elmers End is a railway station and tram terminus in Elmers End, south London, England. It is in the London Borough of Bromley and on the railway it is  down the line from London Charing Cross.
 
The railway through Elmers End was opened by the South Eastern Railway on 1 April 1864 as an extension of the Mid-Kent Line from New Beckenham to Addiscombe; there was a branch, opened on 29 May 1882 to Hayes at this station. The portion of the line to Addiscombe, which was originally named Croydon (Addiscombe Road), was closed in 1997 when Tramlink took over much of the trackbed from Elmers End.

The Hayes line service on the suburban commuter railway line between Hayes and London Charing Cross through Elmers End is still in use. The station is on Elmers End Road (A214), at the south-east corner of South Norwood Country Park.

One former platform is now the terminus for Tramlink services to central Croydon.

Work is underway to open a second tram platform and double the tram line to Arena to increase capacity. As of March 2019, vegetation has been cleared to make way for the new line. The platform was due to open in December 2020, but has been delayed.

History

Early years (1857-1922)
The Mid Kent line was built by the Mid-Kent and North Kent Junction Railway (MK&NKJR) and was opened on 1 January 1857 as far as Beckenham Junction. From opening the line was worked by the South Eastern Railway (SER).
Seven years later the MK&NKJR built an extension from a new junction station at New Beckenham to Croydon (Addiscombe Road) with an intermediate station at Elmers End, which again was operated by the SER from opening. The station was occupied in what was then a rural area with scattered farm houses and hamlets. The station building was located on the down side whilst a goods yard was provided on the up side.

By 1914 Elmers End had almost become part of Beckenham on the east side of the railway. On the opposite side a sewage works, the Croydon Council refuse destructor, Beckenham Council's refuse destructor and electric power station as well as two brick works and Crystal Palace District Cemetery were all located. Sidings served the Croydon and Beckenham Council sites.

The station was rebuilt in 1881/2 in anticipation of the opening of the Hayes branch. Bay platforms were provided on the up and down side and a new 43 lever signal box was provided immediately south of the station. New coal sidings, in anticipation of further suburban growth, were also provided on the up side.

The Elmers End – Hayes section was built by the West Wickham & Hayes Railway, and left the existing line just south of the station on a tight 13 chain curve. It was sold to the South Eastern Railway in 1881 and opened on 29 May 1882. Initially 13 services each way were operated between Elmers End and Hayes with central London passengers having to change trains.

In 1898 the South Eastern Railway and its bitter rivals the London Chatham & Dover Railway agreed to work as one railway company under the name of the South Eastern & Chatham Railway and Elmers End became an SECR station.

Southern Railway (1923-1947)
Following the Railways Act 1921 (also known as the Grouping Act), Elmers End became a Southern Railway station on 1 January 1923.

The Mid-Kent line was electrified with the (750 V DC third rail) system and electric services commenced on 28 February 1926.  Early electric services were worked by early Southern Railway 3-car Electric Multiple Unit trains often built from old SECR carriages. In connection with the electrification the track bed between Elmers End and Clock House area was raised in an effort to reduce flooding. Electrification led to further house building between Clock House and Elmers End stations.

During World War 2 the station was hit three times by bombs during 1941. Some track alterations took place in 1947 which included the link between the Up Bay and Hayes line being removed, platform lengthening and direct access from the Hayes branch to the down bay.

British Railways (1948-1994)
After World War II and following nationalisation on 1 January 1948, the station fell under the auspices of Southern Region of British Railways. Three-aspect colour light signals were installed at the station in 1956.

The goods yard was closed on 6 May 1963.

The station building was destroyed by fire on 16 December 1973

On 28 May 1975 all signalling came under the control of the London Bridge Signalling Centre and the 1882 signal box was closed. The down bay was taken out of passenger use and became an engineer's siding.
Upon sectorisation in 1982, three passenger sectors were created: InterCity, operating principal express services; and London & South East (renamed Network SouthEast in 1986) who operated commuter services in the London area.

Services to Sanderstead ceased in May 1983 with closure of the Woodside and South Croydon Joint Railway.

The privatisation era (1994-Present Day)
Following privatisation of British Rail on 1 April 1994 the infrastructure at Elmers End station became the responsibility of Railtrack whilst a business unit operated the train services. On 13 October 1996 operation of the passenger services passed to Connex South Eastern who were originally due to run the franchise until 2011.

In 1997 the line to Addiscombe closed – up to this point it was generally worked by a 2-car EMU connecting to and from Hayes services. The section to Woodside and part of the former route to Selsdon re-opened in 2000 as part of the Croydon Tramlink network.

Following a number of accidents and financial issues Railtrack plc was sold to Network Rail on 3 October 2002 who became responsible for the infrastructure.

On 27 June 2003 the Strategic Rail Authority decided to strip Connex of the franchise citing poor financial management and run the franchise itself. Connex South Eastern continued to operate the franchise until 8 November 2003 with the services transferring to the Strategic Rail Authority's South Eastern Trains subsidiary the following day.

On 30 November 2005 the Department for Transport awarded Govia the Integrated Kent franchise. The services operated by South Eastern Trains transferred to Southeastern on 1 April 2006.

Services

National Rail

The typical off-peak service in trains per hour is:
 4 tph to 

On Sundays, the station is served by a half-hourly service between Hayes and London Charing Cross via Lewisham.

London Trams
Tram services at Elmers End are operated by Tramlink. The tram stop is served by trams every 10 minutes to  via Croydon. This is reduced to a tram every 15 minutes on Saturday evenings and Sundays.

Services are operated using Bombardier CR4000 and Stadler Variobahn Trams.

Connections
London Buses routes 54, 356 and 289 serve the station from the adjacent Elmers End Interchange.

See also
 Addiscombe Line
 Woodside and South Croydon Railway

Notes

References

External links 

Elmers End tram Stop – Timetables and live departures at Transport for London

Railway stations in the London Borough of Bromley
Former South Eastern Railway (UK) stations
Railway stations in Great Britain opened in 1864
Railway stations served by Southeastern
Tramlink stops in the London Borough of Bromley